Ajjenahalli may refer to:

Places 

 Ajjenahalli, Alur, a village in Hassan, India
 Ajjenahalli, Belur, a village in Hassan, India
 Ajjenahalli, Sira, a village in Tumkur, India
 Ajjenahalli, Turuvekere, a village in Tumkur, India
 Ajjenahalli, Koratagere, a village in Tumkur, India
 Ajjenahalli, Chiknayakanhalli, a village in Tumkur, India